Shining Hour is an album by guitarist Larry Coryell which was recorded in 1989 and released on the Muse label.

Reception

The AllMusic review by Scott Yanow stated "Larry Coryell will always be best known for arguably being the first fusion guitarist, but his career has been quite wide-ranging ever since the late '60s. On Shining Hour, he mostly sticks to jazz standards ... Coryell, whose playing works well in this (for him) rare setting although he is not really a boppish improviser".

Track listing
 "Nefertiti" (Wayne Shorter) - 6:30
 "Apathy Rains" (Brian Torff) – 6:20
 "Yesterdays" (Jerome Kern, Otto Harbach) – 5:35
 "Floyd Gets a Gig" (Larry Coryell) – 5:40
 "The Duke" (Dave Brubeck) – 4:45
 "My Shining Hour" (Harold Arlen, Johnny Mercer) – 5:00
 "The Sorcerer" (Herbie Hancock) – 6:10
 "All the Things You Are" (Kern, Oscar Hammerstein II) – 8:40

Personnel
Larry Coryell – guitar
Kenny Barron – piano 
Buster Williams – bass 
Marvin Smith – drums

References

Muse Records albums
Larry Coryell albums
1990 albums
Albums recorded at Van Gelder Studio